Pseudathyma michelae is a butterfly in the family Nymphalidae. It is found in Cameroon, the Central African Republic, Gabon, the Republic of the Congo and the Democratic Republic of the Congo.

References

Butterflies described in 2002
Pseudathyma